Liceaga (also Licéaga) is a surname. Notable people with he surname include:
 Alejandro Díaz Liceága (born 1996), Mexican footballer
 Eduardo Liceaga (1839–1920), Mexican physician
 Rodrigo Reina Liceaga (born 1973), Mexican politician
 Casimiro Liceaga (1792–1855), Mexican physician and politician